Grzymiradz  (formerly German Grünrade) is a village in the administrative district of Gmina Dębno, within Myślibórz County, West Pomeranian Voivodeship, in north-western Poland.

The village has a population of 223.

References

Grzymiradz